Airline Inthyrath (born June 21, 1984), known by her stage name Jujubee, is an American drag queen, reality television personality, and recording artist from Lowell, Massachusetts. She first rose to prominence in 2010 as a contestant on the second season of RuPaul's Drag Race, and later returned to compete on the first and fifth seasons of RuPaul's Drag Race All Stars, and the first season of RuPaul's Drag Race: UK vs the World (2022), becoming one of the most popular queens from the franchise. She has the unique distinction of being the only contestant to reach the finale of the competition four times. Additionally, she was a main cast member on the makeover television series RuPaul's Drag U (2010–2012), Dragnificent (2019–2020), and RuPaul's Secret Celebrity Drag Race (2022). In 2021, she competed on the first season of Paramount+ singing competition Queen of the Universe.

Early life 
Inthyrath was born to a Laotian Buddhist family in Fresno, California and raised in Lowell, Massachusetts. Her father died when Inthyrath was 15 years old and the same year her mother abandoned her and her two sisters. Her drag mother is Boston performer Karisma Geneva-Jackson Tae. She graduated from Lowell High School in Lowell, Massachusetts. She earned a Bachelor of Arts degree in theatre arts from the University of Massachusetts, Amherst.

Career

2010–2018: RuPaul's Drag Race 
Jujubee appeared on the second season of RuPaul's Drag Race when she was 25, finishing in third place out of twelve. Jujubee, along with fellow season two contestants Tyra Sanchez, Raven, Pandora Boxx, and Morgan McMichaels served as drag professors on RuPaul's Drag U, a spin-off of Drag Race that premiered on the Logo network in June 2010. She made at least one appearance on all three seasons of Drag U. She was also nominated for a 2010 NewNowNext Award for "Most Addictive Reality Star".

On August 6, 2012, it was announced that Jujubee was one of twelve past Drag Race contestants selected to join the first cast of RuPaul's Drag Race All Stars, which premiered on the Logo network on October 22, 2012. Paired with contestant Raven to form Team Rujubee the duo managed to make it to the finale which aired on November 26, 2012, where she landed in third/fourth place with fellow contestant Shannel.

In 2014, an animated version of Jujubee appeared in the "RuPaul's Drag Race: Dragopolis 2.0" mobile app. She was featured in a series of ads with Gilead to raise HIV/AIDS awareness. She and Raven appeared as guests on "Snatch Game" during the second season of RuPaul's Drag Race All Stars. She was a guest on the first episode of season 10 for the first mini-challenge. She appeared in the music video for RuPaul's song "Jealous of My Boogie". She later appeared in the music video "Queen" by Mimi Imfurst's band Xelle, along with other RuPaul's Drag Race contestants. She was also in the video for Blair St. Clair's "Call My Life" in 2018.

2019–2020: Dragnificent and RuPaul's Drag Race All Stars Season 5 

She appeared with BeBe Zahara Benet, Thorgy Thor and Alexis Michelle in the TLC show Drag Me Down the Aisle, which premiered on March 9, 2019. Jujubee appeared in the Netflix series AJ and the Queen starring RuPaul in 2020 as pageant contestant Lee St. Lee.

On May 8, 2020, Jujubee was announced as one of the ten past Drag Race contestants selected to join the fifth season of RuPaul's Drag Race All Stars, which premiered on VH1 on June 5, 2020. She became the fourth queen, along with fellow All Stars 5 competitor Alexis Mateo, to compete on three different seasons of Drag Race, following Shangela, Latrice Royale, and Manila Luzon. She won her first ever main challenge in episode 3, after designing a signature hotel suite entitled "The Glamazone" alongside Mateo and India Ferrah. She would lose her first ever lip-sync later in the episode, falling in a lip sync for your legacy to Lizzo's "Juice" against the lip sync assassin Monét X Change. She went on to reach the top 3 of the season, becoming the first queen in Drag Race herstory to make it to the finale in three separate seasons.

2021–present: Queen of the Universe and RuPaul's Drag Race: UK vs The World 
In November 2021, Jujubee was announced as one of fourteen contestants on the debut season of Queen of the Universe, an international drag queen singing competition, and a spin-off of RuPaul's Drag Race. She was eliminated in the second episode after singing Ariana Grande's "Into You".

In January 2022, she was announced as one of the nine contestants on RuPaul's Drag Race: UK vs the World, becoming the very first Drag Race queen to compete on four separate seasons in the franchise. After the show aired, Jujubee announced that it would likely be the last time she competes in a drag competition.

She is among the most followed queens from Drag Race, and as of October 2021, has accumulated over 1.1 million Instagram followers.

Queen of Hearts 

In 2022, Jujubee hosted a dating game show podcast titled Queen of Hearts.

Queen of Hearts is an American dating game show podcast created in 2022 and hosted by Jujubee.

Jujubee, who is known for RuPaul's Drag Race, has created this podcast, which is formatted as a blind-date game show with the help of Wondery, Amazon Music, and Rococo Punch.

Each episode is hosted by Jujubee, who plays as a matchmaker for heartbroken individuals who are looking for love.

André Hereford of Metro Weekly wrote, "Episodes typically clock in at 35 minutes or less, with Jujubee guiding each eager contestant — folks of different genders and persuasions — to choose from three potential matches. Upon listening to a few episodes, one thing is undeniable: flirting and attraction come through really clearly in an audio-only format. Voices give everything away."

In Gaynrd, someone wrote, "Fans of 2000s-era MTV dating shows like Next and current fare such as Love Island, as well as Drag Race fans around the world, will enjoy the irresistible potion of provocative, hilarious and heartfelt that is Queen of Hearts."

In Out Magazine, Bernardo Sim wrote, "Now, Jujubee is taking a break from drag competitions to host her own podcast series, Queen of Hearts. In it, Juju will help people connect and potentially go on a date together – all without seeing each other. In each episode, Jujubee hosts a series of games and asks several questions to ensure that these contestants can find some chemistry between them."

Music
Jujubee released her debut extended play record, Good Juju: Vol. 1, on June 23, 2020. The song "Don't Wanna Love" was performed on the first episode of All Stars 5. A sequel, Good Juju: Vol. 2, was released on July 21, 2020, with the lead single "Tonight or Forever" featuring fellow All Stars 5 contestant Blair St. Clair being released on July 14, 2020.

In May 2022, Jujubee portrayed the voice of The Tigress in Alaska's Drag: The Musical, a studio recording of a planned stage production about two rival drag bars that go head-to-head while struggling through financial troubles.

Discography

Remix albums

Compilation albums

Live albums

Extended plays

Singles

As lead artist

As featured artist

Other appearances

Filmography

Television

Theatre

Music videos

Web series

Podcasting

Awards and nominations

|-
! scope="row" | 2022
| Herself
| Queerty for Drag Royalty 
| 
|-
! scope="row" | 2022
| Cast Reveal(s)
| WOWIE Award for Best Viral Moment
|

References

External links

 
 

1984 births
Living people
Asian-American drag queens
American people of Laotian descent
American people of Thai descent
American LGBT people of Asian descent
People from Boston
RuPaul's Drag Race contestants
Jujubee
LGBT people from Massachusetts
LGBT people from California
Queen of the Universe contestants